The British Rail Classes 105 and 106 diesel multiple units were built by Cravens Ltd. of Sheffield from 1956 to 1959. The class were built with a side profile identical to British Railways Mark 1 carriage stock, using the same doors and windows.  None were selected for refurbishment. The last passenger car was withdrawn from service in 1988.

Originally AEC engined vehicles were class 105 and Leyland engined vehicles were class 106, but in the late 1970s they all became class 105s.

Usage

Units initially designated to work on the former Midland and Great Northern Joint Railway lines were moved to services from London King's Cross upon the closure of the M&GN joint lines in 1959. Units were also used on the London Midland Region and in Scotland, particularly in Aberdeenshire. The closure of many of these lines in the 1960s resulted in their dispersal throughout Great Britain, notably to Tyseley depot near Birmingham. The electrification of the lines from London King's Cross and the introduction of the Class 313 EMUs in 1976 led to the withdrawal of many Cravens units. 

Norwich was the last depot to operate the Cravens units, with set 30 being returned to green livery, and gaining some celebrity status towards the end of its service life. The unit was, however, contaminated with asbestos and consequently scrapped.

Orders

Technical details
 Builder: Cravens
 Introduced: 1956
 Coupling Code: Blue Square
 Body: 57 ft 6 in x 9 ft 2 in 
 Engines: Two BUT, 150 bhp
 Transmission: Standard mechanical

For coupling codes see British United Traction

Preservation

Due to the use of asbestos in their construction, and extended usage by BR, the class has fared very badly in preservation. 51485 and 56121 were preserved by the West Somerset Railway but moved to the East Lancashire Railway in 1997 where they have been restored after asbestos stripping. 56456 is based on the Llangollen Railway, working initially with a Class 127.  The National Railway Museum had intended to preserve 53812 - which had been stripped of asbestos but a lack of space prevented this car and the Class 100 coupled to it from being moved to York and they were vandalised beyond repair at Crewe.

Models
Bachmann produce 00 scale models of the class 105 in both BR green and BR blue liveries.

References

Sources

Further reading
Motive Power Recognition: 3 DMUs. Colin J. Marsden
British Railway Pictorial: First Generation DMUs.  Kevin Robertson
British Rail Fleet Survey 8: Diesel Multiple Units- The First Generation.  Brian Haresnape
A Pictorial Record of British Railways Diesel Multiple Units.  Brian Golding

External links
 History of the Class 105s

105
Cravens multiple units
Train-related introductions in 1959